Hydriomena crokeri is a species of geometrid moth in the family Geometridae. It is found in North America.

The MONA or Hodges number for Hydriomena crokeri is 7247.

References

Further reading

 
 

Hydriomena
Articles created by Qbugbot
Moths described in 1910